Rendahlia jaubertensis is a species of sole native to the Pacific coast of Australia.  This species is the only known member of its genus.

References
 

Soleidae
Marine fish of Western Australia
Monotypic fish genera
Taxa named by Paul Chabanaud